This is intended to be a complete list of properties and districts listed on the National Register of Historic Places in Allegany County, New York.  The locations of National Register properties and districts for which the latitude and longitude coordinates are included below, may be seen in a map.



Current listings

|}

References

External links

A useful list of the above sites, with street addresses and other information, is available at National Register of Historic Places.Com, a private site serving up public domain information on NRHPs.

Allegany County, New York
Allegany